

The year 2005 in birding and ornithology.

Worldwide

New species
See Bird species new to science described in the 2000s.

Rediscoveries
In April, an announcement is made that the ivory-billed woodpecker has been rediscovered in North America; in July, doubt is cast on this claim. The debate remains unresolved.

Extinctions
The thick-billed ground-dove (Gallicolumba salamonis), last seen in 1927, is officially declared extinct.

Taxonomic developments
 The British Ornithologists' Union Records Committee announce that they have adopted the following species split:
 Common scoter and black scoter
 Velvet scoter and white-winged scoter
 Greater Canada goose and Lesser Canada goose
 Yellow-legged gull (split from herring gull)

Ornithologists

Deaths
 3 February - Ernst Mayr (born 1904)
 25 February - Tony Norris (born 1917)
 23 May – Derek Ratcliffe (born 1929)
 9 June - James F. Clements (born 1927)
 3 September - R. S. R. Fitter (born 1913)

World listing
 American Peter Kaestner becomes the fourth person ever to see over 8000 species of bird alive.

Europe

Britain

Breeding birds
 A pair of European bee-eaters makes a nesting attempt in Herefordshire - see Bee-eaters in Britain

Migrant and wintering birds
 The first part of the year sees a large influx of waxwings into southern England.

Rare birds
 Britain's third belted kingfisher was found on 1 April in Staffordshire, and was later seen briefly in east Yorkshire, then in Northeast Scotland; the last was in 1980.
 Britain's second Barrow's goldeneye was found in May in Northeast Scotland.
 Britain's second Audouin's gull was seen briefly at Spurn, east Yorkshire on 1 June.
 An influx of trumpeter finches in Kent and Suffolk in the spring are the first of this species to be seen in Britain since the early 1990s.
 A sooty tern visited the Anglesey tern colonies in North Wales in July - the first ever in Britain to be seen by large numbers of birders.
 Britain's first Swinhoe's storm petrel on a pelagic, 17 km south of the Isles of Scilly on 21 July.
 A yellow warbler on Unst, Shetland in September is Britain's fifth.
 A Siberian rubythroat on Fair Isle, Shetland in October is also Britain's fifth.
 Britain's first magnificent frigatebird is found moribund in Whitchurch, Shropshire following Hurricane Wilma, and dies in care at Chester Zoo
 Britain's fifth green heron is found on Anglesey in November
 Hurricane Wilma also brought an unprecedented influx of laughing gulls to Britain during November

Other Events
 The British Birdwatching Fair has Myanmar as its theme for the year.

Ireland

Rare birds
 Ireland's first green heron is found in County Cork in October
 Ireland's first Barrow's goldeneye is found at Quoile Pondage in County Down in November

References

Birding and ornithology
Birding and ornithology by year
Ornithology